Filip Knežević (born 8 November 1991) is a Serbian footballer who plays as a winger.

Club career

Borac Čačak
Before making his professional debut for Borac Čačak, Knežević was the top goalscorer of Borac's youth team. He made his debut for Borac Čačak at the age of 17 in the 2009–10 season, during which he scored one goal in 23 league appearances. In the following seasons he would become Borac's most prolific attacking player in terms of appearances. By the time he left Borac, he was regarded as one of the brightest football talents in Serbia, with the Serbian press even comparing him to Cristiano Ronaldo due to his signature dribbling and speed.

Partizan
On 16 June 2012, Knežević signed a four-year contract with Partizan, and was assigned the number 77 on his jersey. By December 2012, he featured for Partizan in just one league match, with coach Vladimir Vermezović giving him only 50 minutes of playing time over his first four months at the club.

Loan to Radnički 1923
He then spent the 2013–14 season on loan with Radnički 1923. On October 19, 2013, Knežević scored a brace in Radnički's 3-2 win against OFK Beograd. On May 3, 2014, Knežević scored in Radnički's 1-0 win against Čukarički, in a match that determined whether or not Radnički would remain in the SuperLiga or get demoted to the Serbian second tier.

Loan to Vitória de Guimarães
On 4 July 2014, Knežević signed a loan deal with Primeira Liga side Vitória Guimarães. However, he spent most of his time at the B team, playing in Segunda Liga.

Loan to Borac Čačak
In July 2015, Knežević returned to FK Borac Čačak.

Čukarički
Finally, after three-and-a-half years at Partizan, where he played only a handful of games, spending most of his time on loans, on 10 February 2016, Knežević signed for another Belgrade-based club Čukarički.

Vojvodina
On 16 August 2016, Knežević signed a two-and-a-half-year deal with Vojvodina.

Return to Borac Čačak
In summer 2017, Knežević returned to Borac Čačak as a single player, taking number 1 jersey.

International career
Knežević played three matches for the Serbian national under-21 team, making his debut in a friendly against Ukraine U21 on 29 March 2011. He recorded two more appearances that year.

Career statistics

Honours
Borac Čačak
 Serbian Cup Runner-up: 2011–12

Partizan
 Serbian SuperLiga: 2012–13

References

External links

 UEFA profile
 

1991 births
Living people
Serbian footballers
Association football midfielders
FK Borac Čačak players
FK Partizan players
FK Radnički 1923 players
Vitória S.C. players
FK Čukarički players
FK Vojvodina players
F.C. Ashdod players
FK Radnički Niš players
FK Proleter Novi Sad players
SHB Da Nang FC players
Sportspeople from Kraljevo
Serbian SuperLiga players
Primeira Liga players
Israeli Premier League players
V.League 1 players
Serbia under-21 international footballers
Serbian expatriate footballers
Expatriate footballers in Portugal
Expatriate footballers in Israel
Expatriate footballers in Vietnam
Serbian expatriate sportspeople in Portugal
Serbian expatriate sportspeople in Israel
Serbian expatriate sportspeople in Vietnam